Larinopoda tera is a butterfly in the family Lycaenidae. It is found in Cameroon, Equatorial Guinea, Gabon, the Republic of the Congo, Angola, the Democratic Republic of the Congo (Uele, Ituri, Kivu, Tshuapa, Equateur, Sankuru and Lualaba), Uganda, western Kenya and western Tanzania. The habitat consists of primary lowland forests.

The larvae feed on lichens growing on tree trunks.

References

Butterflies described in 1873
Poritiinae
Butterflies of Africa
Taxa named by William Chapman Hewitson